The Informant may refer to:
The Informant (1997 film), a TV movie about Northern Ireland
The Informant (2013 film), a 2013 French film
The Informant (book), a 2000 book by Kurt Eichenwald
The Informant!, a 2009 film based on the book
The Informant (TV series), 2022 Hungarian-language TV series

See also
 Informant (disambiguation)
 The Informer (disambiguation)